Captain Macklin is a 1915 American short drama film directed by  John B. O'Brien. A lost film.

Cast
 Jack Conway as Capt. Royal Macklin
 Lillian Gish as Beatrice
 Spottiswoode Aitken as Gen. Laquerre
 William Lowery as Heinz (as W.E. Lowery)
 Dark Cloud as Gen. Garcia
 Erich von Stroheim as Officer on Horseback (uncredited)

See also
 List of American films of 1915
 Lillian Gish filmography

References

External links

allmovie/synopsis

1915 films
1915 drama films
1915 short films
American silent short films
American black-and-white films
Silent American drama films
Lost American films
Films based on American novels
Films set in South America
1915 lost films
Lost drama films
Films directed by John B. O'Brien
1910s American films